Masood Ali Khan, also known as M.A. Khan, (born 15 March 1947 in Hyderabad, India) (M.A., Ph.D.) is a scholar, historian and a writer on Islamic history, culture, and religion. He is currently working as acting director of the Indian Council of Social Science Research, Southern Regional Centre, Osmania University, Hyderabad, India. He writes on social problems of Indian Muslims, Indian diaspora, sociology of migration, and Urdu press and journalism. He was born to a Hyderabadi Muslim family.

Books

Khan has written books and articles in research journals, has supervised and reviewed half a dozen books and contributed about 100 articles in Urdu on social problems of Indian Muslims. He has presented research papers in the United States, UK, Canada, France, Turkey and Malaysia. He served as a consultant to research projects commissioned by the Indian Council of Social Science Research and the Indian Council of Historical Research. Some of his books include:
 Encyclopedia of world geography
 Cultural Sociology of India
 Encyclopaedia of Islam
 Encyclopaedia of Sufism (12 volume set)
 International encyclopaedia of librarianship
 The expansion of Islam
 The Islamic Fundamentalism
 Minorities in India
 The Quranic studies
 Mystics and mysticism in Islam
 Islam in modern India
 Social work and social policy (concepts and methods)
 Religious doctrine of Islam
 Islam in the Arabic world
 Islam (birth and origin)
 Islam (rise and growth)
 Life and times of Prophet Muhammad
 Women in Islam
 Islamic laws
 Islam in the modern world
 Traditions in Islam
 History and sociology in India
 The methods of social research
 Women and human rights
 Perspectives on Indo-Pak relations
Islamic Jihad

See also
Hyderabadi Muslims 
Muhammad Hamidullah

Reference list

External links

List of his books
List of his books

1947 births
Living people
Scholars from Hyderabad, India
Indian Sunni Muslim scholars of Islam
20th-century Indian historians
Indian male writers
International relations scholars
Indian magazine editors